Mehr Ali (مہر علی) is a village located in Razar Tehsil, Swabi District in the Pakistani province of Khyber Pakhtunkhwa. The road from Shewa Adda leading to Sher Darra passes through Mehr Ali.  The road ends at Sher Darra, a village about three kilometres at the north of Mehr Ali from where the Buner District starts.  It is surrounded by Barsati Nalahs from the east and west.  There are two roads; one of them leads from Rustam via Machi Mardan District, and another from Mehr Ali links to another road that leads to Swat valley.  It lies at the foot of the Himalayan range of mountains.

Tribe
The main tribe living here are the Yousafzai Nawarkhel, a well known family of Swabi District. They are the owners of the land of this village. Some other families also live here who are peasants.

Population
The village consists of about 300 homes.

Education
Most of the people who live here rely on subsistence farming. Those with some degree of education serve in various departments, i.e., army, police, rangers, education, and agriculture. There are two primary schools for boys and one for girls: one is BHU and  the other is run by a non-governmental organization.

References 
http://www.schoolinglog.com/school/Government-Primary-School-MEHR-ALI-NO.1-Swabi_167679.html

http://www.schoolinglog.com/school/Government-Primary-School-MEHR-ALI-NO.2-Swabi_167669.html

Populated places in Swabi District